The Daytona Tortugas are a Minor League Baseball team of the Florida State League and the Single-A affiliate of the Cincinnati Reds. They are located in Daytona Beach, Florida, and play their home games at Jackie Robinson Ballpark; opened in 1914, the park seats 4,200 people.

The club was previously known as the Daytona Cubs from 1993 to 2014 when they were an affiliate of the Chicago Cubs. The team has won six Florida State League championships: in 1995, 2000, 2004 (co-champions with the Tampa Yankees), 2008, 2011, and 2013.

History

Daytona Beach Admirals
The last Florida State League (FSL) baseball team to play in Daytona Beach, was known as the Daytona Beach Admirals, the Class A affiliate of the Chicago White Sox. In September 1987, the White Sox decided to move their Class A affiliate to Sarasota. This left Daytona without a major league player development contract, resulting in the Admirals' owner selling the team to the New York Mets. The Mets moved the team to Port St. Lucie to become the St. Lucie Mets. Daytona did not have professional baseball for five years after the move.

Chicago Cubs
Prior to 1993, the Chicago Cubs were affiliated with the Winston Salem Warthogs, a Class A team that played in the Carolina League. At the end of the 1992 season, the Cubs decided to move their Class A affiliate to Florida. The Florida State League originally assigned the transplanted Cubs team to play at Baseball City Stadium in Davenport. However, Jordan Kobritz, the new owner and general manager of the minor league franchise, wanted the team to play in Daytona Beach instead. Negotiations to bring the Cubs to Daytona Beach went on for a couple of months and were completed just in time to start the new season.

The Daytona Cubs opened their first season on the road, sweeping the Vero Beach Dodgers, two games to zero. The home opener was scheduled for April 12. Jackie Robinson Ballpark was sold out on opening night. Chelsea Clinton, President Clinton's daughter, was invited to Daytona to throw the opening pitch. The young Ms. Clinton could not attend due to a family medical emergency, and Daytona Beach Mayor Larry Kelly and FSL President Chuck Murphy threw the ceremonial opening pitches instead. The Cubs' public address announcer led fans in singing "Go, Cubs, Go", although with slightly altered lyrics (substituting "Daytona" for "Chicago"). The Daytona Cubs won their home opener 5–2 against the Sarasota White Sox, the Class A affiliate of the Chicago White Sox who left Daytona Beach five years earlier.

Cincinnati Reds 
After the 2014 season, the Cubs ended their affiliation with Daytona, and signed a new contract with the Myrtle Beach Pelicans of the Carolina League. Daytona reached an agreement with the Cincinnati Reds following the 2014 season, and announced the team would be rebranded with a new name with a "local angle" in 2015. They chose the name "Tortugas".

On June 3, 2015, Big Game Florida, LLC, headed by Andy Rayburn, sold the team to Tortugas Baseball Club, LLC, headed by Reese Smith III with partners Bob Fregolle and Rick French. Smith plans to keep the team in Daytona.

Season-by-season results

Ballparks

Jackie Robinson Ballpark 

The Daytona Tortugas' current, and only, ballpark is Jackie Robinson Ballpark. The venue has experienced several expansions and renovations since its completion in 1914, and currently seats 4,200 spectators.

Melching Field at Conrad Park 

In 1999, Daytona Cubs' owner and General Manager Jordan Kobritz decided to move a home game to Melching Field at Conrad Park, located in nearby DeLand. This ballpark is the home of the Stetson University Hatters baseball team. Kobritz's goal was to generate some fan interest in the Cubs, in the western part of Volusia County. The game (vs. the St. Petersburg Devil Rays) was played on June 26, 1999. In August 2004, the D-Cubs had to move several games to Melching Field, due to damage to Jackie Robinson Ballpark, caused by Hurricane Charley. The Cubs paid another visit to Melching Field on June 20, 2007, when they played a double-header against the Palm Beach Cardinals. The game was moved this time to benefit a local charity in DeLand, as well as provide another opportunity to showcase the Daytona Cubs to fans in DeLand.

Uniforms

Current 

The team's color scheme consists of blue and green. Jerseys and pants for home games are made of white fabric with green trim, while those for road games are made of gray fabric with blue trim. On home jerseys, the word "Tortugas" is scripted across the chest in green. On road jerseys, the word "Daytona" is written across the chest in blue script. The player's number is written on the back in large green characters surrounded by blue.

The team's batting practice uniforms, which double as alternate uniforms, are made of green fabric. "Tortugas" is written across the chest in white script, trimmed in blue. There is a Daytona Tortugas logo on the right shoulder. Numbers, in white surrounded by blue, are sewn on the back in block characters.

The official home and road caps were green with Daytona Tortugas logo centered on the front. The batting practice/alternate caps are blue in color, with a white front and blue brim. The alternate Shelldon head logo is in the center of the cap. A green belt is typically worn.

Past
From 1993 to 2014 as the Cubs, the team's color scheme consisted of red, white, and blue, the same colors used by the Chicago Cubs. The uniforms of the Daytona Cubs were descendants of the Chicago Cubs' uniforms. Jerseys and pants for home games were made of white fabric with blue pinstripes, while those for road games were made of gray fabric with blue pinstripes. On home jerseys, the Chicago Cubs logo was located on the left chest, and a Daytona Cubs logo was located on the left sleeve. On road jerseys, the word "Daytona" was written across the chest in red script, and a Daytona Cubs logo was present on the left shoulder. The player's number was written on the back in large blue characters surrounded by red. Blue T-shirts of varying sleeve lengths were worn underneath the jerseys. The team's batting practice uniforms, which doubled as alternate uniforms, were made of light blue fabric with white pinstripes. "Daytona" was written across the chest in red script. There was a Daytona Cubs logo on the left shoulder. Numbers, in blue surrounded by red, were sewn on the back in block characters. The official home and road caps were blue with either the Chicago Cubs or Daytona Cubs logo centered on the front. A blue belt was worn on all the different uniforms along with blue ankle-length socks.

Mascot 

The team's mascot is an anthropomorphic turtle ("Tortuga") named Shelldon. Since his first season in 2015, "Daytona's favorite party animal" acts as the team's Goodwill Ambassador, visiting local schools and charity events when he is not performing at home games.

Shelldon is a green and white sea turtle with a blue shell on his back, dark green spots, and an occasional backwards cap. He sports his white Tortuga jersey almost daily but changes into elaborate costumes for on-field skits and performances. Daytona Tortuga fans have learned to not get attached to any particular players, since the reward for superior play is to be taken away from Daytona and sent up to a higher farm team. Shelldon has been an adequate substitute to represent the team to the public and can constantly be seen tumbling, breakdancing, and generating fun around Daytona.

Shelldon was also named the #1 Florida State League Mascot by The Athletic. 

He is also joined by Shelly, a female turtle who supports the Tortugas' involvement in the community and is Shelldon's girlfriend. She debuted as the second team mascot in 2018.

Past
Prior to becoming the Tortugas, the Daytona Cubs originally used a version of the Chicago Cubs emblem. In 1994, the Cubs hired Benedict Advertising, a local marketing firm, to develop a new logo. Benedict's design department created a bear cub wearing sunglasses and a backwards baseball cap.

As a mascot, Cubby first appeared on the field on May 27, 1994. He had brown fur and wore the same style of uniform as the team, but wearing his hat backwards.

On-Field Host 
As of the 2021 season, the team's On-field host/Master of Ceremonies is The Young Professor, Matt Graifer. Previously, The Professor served in that role for the National Arena League professional football team the Jacksonville Sharks for the 2018 and 2019 seasons and is also well known for his work as a local live trivia host and professional sports announcer in mixed martial arts, boxing, and professional wrestling. In 2021 he wore a different outfit to every single home game he attended. During the July 4th, 2021 game, he donned 17 different patriotic outfits and participated in 17 on-field promotions for every half inning of the game.

Prior to 2021, the On-Field Host role was played by Jim Jaworski, team General Manager.

Media

Radio
Justin Rocke, the Tortugas Director of Broadcasting and Media Relations, provides the play-by-play coverage.

Print 
Local newspaper coverage of the team is provided by The Daytona Beach News-Journal.

Memorable events and records

Four home runs in a game
 Ryan Harvey, July 28, 2006, game vs. Clearwater Threshers (Daytona won, 10–9), hit four home runs in one game.
Javier Báez, June 10, 2013, game vs. Fort Myers Miracle (Daytona won 9–6), hit four home runs in one game.

Hitting for the cycle
Four Daytona players have hit for the cycle to date:
 Adam Greenberg, August 17, 2002, game vs. St. Lucie Mets (Daytona won, 17–1)
 Félix Pie, June 27, 2004, game vs. Fort Myers Miracle (Daytona won, 15–14, 10 innings)
 Brett Jackson, June 14, 2010, game vs. Lakeland Flying Tigers (Daytona won, 6–4, 11 innings)
 Albert Almora, July 14, 2014, game vs. Jupiter Hammerheads (Daytona won, 13–8, 13 innings)

No-hitters
 Matt Loosen, July 8, 2013, at Dunedin Blue Jays (Daytona won 7–0). Loosen allows no hits over a full nine innings of work, while walking two and striking out nine.
 Ben Wells, Kyler Burke, Zach Cates; Wednesday, August 21 at Dunedin Blue Jays and Tuesday, August 27, 2013, vs. Dunedin Blue Jays (Daytona won 1–0). Ben Wells pitched a hitless first inning in the first game of a scheduled doubleheader on August 21 at Dunedin, until a rainstorm caused the game to be suspended and eventually completed on August 27 at Daytona (where the Cubs were still the road team, despite playing in their home ballpark). In the resumption of the game on August 27, Kyler Burke didn't allow a hit in five innings of work and Zach Cates closed the game out with a 1-2-3 seventh inning. The game is more than a baseball rarity, considering the no-hitter was technically thrown in two cities, separated by 163 miles of driving distance.
 Tyler Mahle, June 13, 2016, at Jupiter Hammerheads (Daytona won 4–0). Mahle became the first FSL pitcher to toss a nine-inning solo no-hitter since Loosen did it for Daytona almost three years earlier. The only baserunner was a hit batter in the second inning, as Mahle faced the minimum (due to a doubleplay) and struck out six.
 James Proctor, Vin Timpanelli, Ricky Karcher, Nick Hanson and Carson Spiers combined for a 1-0 no-hitter on May 22, 2021 at home against the Jupiter Hammerheads.

Roster

Notable alumni

Florida State League
Some Daytona players have distinguished themselves in the Florida State League

Matt Craig, 2006 FSL All-Star First Baseman
Jake Fox, 2006 FSL All-Star Catcher
Sean Gallagher, 2006 FSL All-Star Pitcher
Mitch Atkins, 2007 FSL All-Star pitcher
Tyler Colvin, 2007 FSL All-Star outfielder
Chris Amador, 2007 FSL All-Star outfielder
Jesus Valdez, 2007 FSL All-Star outfielder
Matt Matulia, 2007 FSL All-Star outfielder
Alex Maestri, 2008 FSL All-Star pitcher
Ryan Searle, 2009 FSL All-Star pitcher
Starlin Castro, 2009 FSL All-Star infielder
Aaron Shafer, 2010 FSL All-Star pitcher
Brett Jackson, 2010 FSL All-Star outfielder
Frank Batista, 2011 FSL All-Star pitcher 
Justin Bour, 2011 FSL All-Star first baseman
Evan Crawford, 2011 FSL All-Star outfielder
Aaron Kurcz, 2011 FSL All-Star pitcher
Junior Lake, 2011 FSL All-Star shortstop
Arismendy Alcantara, 2012 FSL All-Star infielder
John Andreoli, 2012–2013 FSL All-Star outfielder
Austin Kirk, 2012 FSL All-Star pitcher
Matt Loosen, 2012 FSL All-Star pitcher
Nelson Perez, 2012 FSL All-Star pitcher
Greg Rohan, 2012 FSL All-Star infielder
Matt Szczur, 2012 FSL All-Star outfielder
Javier Baez, 2013 FSL All-Star infielder
Frank Del Valle, 2013 FSL All-Star pitcher
Dustin Geiger, 2013 FSL All-Star infielder
Jorge Soler, 2013 FSL All-Star outfielder
Gioskar Amaya, 2014 FSL All-Star infielder
Marco Hernandez, 2014 FSL All-Star infielder
Bijan Rademacher, 2014 FSL All-Star outfielder
Felix Pena, 2014 FSL All-Star pitcher
Andrew McKirahan, 2014 FSL All-Star pitcher
Joe Hudson, 2015 FSL All-Star catcher
Alex Blandino, 2015 FSL All-Star infielder
Phillip Ervin, 2015 FSL All-Star outfielder
Nick Travieso, 2015 FSL All-Star pitcher
Jake Ehret, 2016 FSL All-Star pitcher
Jimmy Herget, 2016 FSL All-Star pitcher
Aristides Aquino, 2016 FSL All-Star outfielder & FSL Player of the Year

Major League players

Many Daytona players have advanced to play in the major leagues. 

Terry Adams, right-handed pitcher
James Adduci, outfielder
Christopher Archer, pitcher
Mitch Atkins, right-handed pitcher
Javier Báez, middle infielder
Richie Barker, right-handed pitcher
Francis Beltrán, right-handed pitcher
Jerry Blevins, left-handed pitcher
Roosevelt Brown, outfielder
Kris Bryant, third baseman
Alex Cabrera, first baseman
Russ Canzler, infield
Esmailin Caridad, right-handed pitcher
Andrew Cashner, right-handed pitcher
Starlin Castro, shortstop
José Ceda, right-handed pitcher
Ronny Cedeño, shortstop
Hunter Cervenka, left-handed pitcher
Rocky Cherry, right-handed pitcher
Robinson Chirinos, catcher
Hee-seop Choi, first baseman
Buck Coats, outfielder
Casey Coleman, pitcher
Tyler Colvin, outfielder
Juan Cruz, right-handed pitcher
Dayán Díaz, right-handed pitcher
Brian Dopirak, first baseman
Scott Downs, left-handed pitcher
Courtney Duncan, pitcher
Carl Edwards, Jr., right-handed pitcher
Scott Eyre, left-handed pitcher
Kyle Farnsworth, right-handed pitcher
Kevin Foster, right-handed pitcher
Chad Fox, right-handed pitcher
Jake Fox, utility player
Sam Fuld, outfielder
Sean Gallagher, right-handed pitcher
Chris Gissell, pitcher
Doug Glanville, outfielder
Geremi González, right-handed pitcher
Tom Gordon, right-handed pitcher
Adam Greenberg, outfielder
Brandon Guyer, outfielder
Ángel Guzmán, right-handed pitcher
Rich Hill, left-handed pitcher
Eric Hinske, infielder and outfielder
Micah Hoffpauir, first baseman and outfielder
Brett Jackson, outfielder
Jay Jackson, pitcher
Robin Jennings, outfielder
Ryan Jorgensen, catcher
David Kelton, infielder and outfielder
Brooks Kieschnick, pitcher and outfielder
Chang-Yong Lim, right-handed pitcher
Casey McGehee, infielder
Carlos Mármol, right-handed pitcher
Sean Marshall, left-handed pitcher
Javier Martínez, right-handed pitcher
Juan Mateo, right-handed pitcher
Adalberto Méndez, right-handed pitcher
Chad Meyers, infielder
José Molina, catcher
Lou Montañez, outfielder
Scott Moore, infielder
Matt Murton, outfielder
Ricky Nolasco, right-handed pitcher
Phil Norton, left-handed pitcher
Will Ohman, left-handed pitcher
Ryan O'Malley, left-handed pitcher
Rey Ordóñez, shortstop
Kevin Orie, third baseman
David Patton, right-handed pitcher
Félix Pie,  outfielder
Carmen Pignatiello, left-handed pitcher
Renyel Pinto, left-handed pitcher
Bo Porter, outfielder
Clay Rapada, left-handed pitcher
José Reyes, catcher
James Russell, left-handed pitcher
Jae Kuk Ryu, right-handed pitcher
Ray Sadler, outfielder
Jeff Samardzija, right-handed pitcher
Ryne Sandberg, infielder
Brian Schlitter, right-handed pitcher
Andrew Sisco, left-handed pitcher
Jason Smith, infielder
Steve Smyth, left-handed pitcher
Jorge Soler, outfielder
Geovany Soto, catcher
Justin Speier, right-handed pitcher
Jason Szuminski, right-handed pitcher
Kevin Tapani, right-handed pitcher
Amaury Telemaco, right-handed pitcher
Nate Teut, left-handed pitcher
Ryan Theriot, infielder
Ismael Valdez, right-handed pitcher
Donnie Veal, left-handed pitcher
Dan Vogelbach, first baseman
Duane Ward, right-handed pitcher
John Webb, pitcher
 Zack Weiss, right-handed pitcher
Todd Wellemeyer, right-handed pitcher
Randy Wells, right-handed pitcher
Randy Williams, pitcher
Kerry Wood, right-handed pitcher
Michael Wuertz, right-handed pitcher
Carlos Zambrano, right-handed pitcher
Pete Zoccolillo, outfielder

Managers 

Thirteen men have managed Daytona baseball teams since the franchise's inception in 1993. Six managers have guided the team to win the FSL Championship: Dave Trembley (1995), Richie Zisk (2000), Steve McFarland (2004), Jody Davis (2008), Buddy Bailey (2011), and Dave Keller (2013). Trembley won 290 games from 1995 to 1996 and 2001 to 2002, placing him first on the all-time wins list for Daytona managers. Having managed the team for 545 games, he is also the longest-tenured manager in team history. The manager with the highest winning percentage over a full season or more is Steve McFarland (.556). Conversely, the lowest winning percentage over a season or more is .429 by the team's first manager, Bill Hays. Buddy Bailey managed his first Daytona game in 2006, was replaced as manager following the season but returned to Daytona in 2009. Eli Marrero managed the Tortugas from 2015 to 2017. Former shortstop Ricky Gutierrez, who won a World Series with the Boston Red Sox in 2004 and was the Tortugas bench coach in 2017, was named the team's full-time manager for the 2018 season.

Photos

Notes
The Record column indicates wins and losses during the regular season and excludes any post-season play.
This column indicates position in the overall league standings.
This column indicates position in the overall divisional standings.
The GB column indicates "Games Behind" the team that finished in first place in the division that season. It is determined by finding the difference in wins plus the difference in losses divided by two.
The Record column indicates wins and losses during the post-season.

References

External links

Daytona Tortugas statistics at Baseball-Reference

1993 establishments in Florida
Chicago Cubs minor league affiliates
Cincinnati Reds minor league affiliates
Baseball teams established in 1993
Sports in Daytona Beach, Florida
Florida State League teams